Jawoon High School (Korean:자운고등학교 Hanja:紫雲高等學校), established in 2004, is a public high school located in Chang 4-Dong, Dobong-gu, Seoul.
Jawoon High School is one of the newest schools with up-to-date facility in Dobong-gu, and it is well known as a Dobong-Vision School with Sunduck High School.

Educational objectives

 Education Goal
With mutual harmony, we perform our roles to create a happy school community.
 School Motto
Kindness· Gratitude· Health
 School Badge
 Circle: completion, harmony
 Triangle: summit of Mt. Dobong
 Cloud: auspicious advancement
 Purple: the highest status
 School Tree & Flower
Zelkova serrata: great figure, majesty
Royal azalea: faith, temperance

School Introduction

Brief History
 May 27, 2002 Approval of school foundation project(coeducation, 36 classes)
 Mar. 1, 2004 The inauguration of Mr. Hwa-seoung Hwang as the 1st principal
 Mar. 2, 2004 1st entrance ceremony(12 classes, 422 students)
 Mar. 1, 2007 The inauguration of Ms. Soon-ja Song as the 2nd principal
 Mar. 2, 2008 Designated as a school for "school community" programs(for 2 years)
 Nov. 26, 2008 Designated as a school for "Education for International Understanding" programs
 Feb. 3, 2009 3rd graduation ceremony(total graduates: 1,237)
 Mar. 2, 2009 6th entrance ceremony(12 classes, 438 students)

Facility

Faculty

Organization of classes & the number of students

Extracurricular activities
 QUASAR (Science Club)
 Sharp (Basketball&Soccer Team)
 J-Sprit (Jawoon Dance People : Dance Group)
 씨밀레 (Library Club)
 Mamanty (Cartoon Club)
 밀알 봉사부 (Voluntary Work Group)
 J-Story (Broadcast Group)
 DICE (Band)
 SHUTTER (Photo Club)
 Newsy (Newspaper)
 가온누리 (Debating Club)
 천유아 (Drama Club)
 MID (Film Production Club)
 크리스탈(UCC Production Club)
 JBC (Music Club)

Special program
 International Understanding Program
 As society changes to globalized and multi-cultural and emphasize autonomy and responsibility of education in school, School specialized programs for International Understanding Curriculum. It includes integrated operation of subject-centered activities, discretionary activities, and extra-curricular activities. Main goal of this program is training global talent.
 Subject-centered Activities
 making lesson plans for International Understanding and teaching them
 Discretionary activities
 the subject of English conversation for 1st grade
 CCAP(Cross-Culture Awareness Programme) classes with foreigners, lectures related with multicultural education and globalization activities
 Extra-curricular activities
 7 clubs related with International Understanding Education
 overseas volunteer activity: selected among 1st & 2nd graders → to Southeast Asia
 interchange with foreign school: student exchange between Korea & Japan
 Support system of International Understanding Education
 agreement to cooperate with HUFS(Hankuk University of Foreign Studies)
 support of UNESCO(related with CCAP)
 Model School for School Community
 Needing for create an educational environment where the school community participates and play a role as a center of education & culture in the community, School raised the level of education by creating a new school.
 Creating an educational environment by developing a school community
 school development committee: with teachers, parents, and local figures
 building consensus among the members of community: parents' association & workshop
 healthy school life: parents' organization monitoring of school lunch
 Educational activities with the members of community
 reading club, fathers' meeting to discuss what's happening in the school, literature-related trip
 MBTI(Myers-Briggs Type Indicator) Test with teachers, students, and parents
 School community activities with local residents
 to open facilities in school: library and gym
 parents' voluntary organization(Saffron)

Reputation

 Under great teacher, many graduates of Jawoon High School go to prestigious universities such as KAIST, Seoul National University, Korea University, Yonsei University, and medical schools.

Direction
 Subway : (Line No. 1 & 4) Chang-dong Station Exit 1 ⇨10 minutes on foot
 Bus : (Bus Stop ①, ②) No. 1119(Academy House ↔ Chang-dong Station), 1161(Duksung Women's University ↔ Nowon-gu Office), 08(Musugol ↔ Chang-dong Station), 09(Dobongsan Station ↔ Chang-dong Station)

Citation
 http://www.siminilbo.co.kr/article.aspx?cat_code=02020000N&article_id=20100104161700139
 http://jawoon.hs.kr

External links
 Official website

See also
 http://www.sen.go.kr
 https://web.archive.org/web/20060220190220/http://www.dobong.go.kr/

High schools in Seoul
Educational institutions established in 2004
Buildings and structures in Dobong District
2004 establishments in South Korea